Anne Spencer, Countess of Sunderland (née Lady Anne Churchill; 27 February 1683 – 15 April 1716), was an English court official and noble. She held the office of Lady of the Bedchamber to Queen Anne from 1702 to 1712.

Life

She was the third daughter of John Churchill, 1st Duke of Marlborough, and the former Sarah Jenyns (Jennings). As her father was created a sovereign prince by the Holy Roman Emperor Joseph I, Anne was also a princess of the Holy Roman Empire and later of the Principality of Mindelheim.

She married 2 January 1700, Charles Spencer, 3rd Earl of Sunderland, and had five children:

 Robert Spencer, 4th Earl of Sunderland (24 October 1701 – 27 November 1729).
 Lady Anne Spencer (1702 – 19 February 1769). Married William Bateman, 1st Viscount Bateman.
 Charles Spencer, 3rd Duke of Marlborough (22 November 1706 – 20 October 1758).
 Hon. John Spencer (13 May 1708 – 19 June 1746). Father of John Spencer, 1st Earl Spencer.
 Lady Diana Spencer (1710 – 27 September 1735). Married John Russell, 4th Duke of Bedford.

As a result of her marriage, Lady Anne Churchill was styled as Countess of Sunderland on 28 September 1702, but is not to be confused with her mother-in-law Anne Digby, also named Anne Spencer, Countess of Sunderland. The title Duke of Marlborough passed over from her elder sister Henrietta to her son Charles.

She died at the age of 33 on 15 April 1716, and was buried on 24 April in Brington, Northamptonshire.

External links

 

1683 births
1716 deaths
Daughters of English dukes
English countesses
Anne Spencer, Countess of Sunderland (1683-1716)
Ladies of the Bedchamber
Court of Anne, Queen of Great Britain